Kaiu is a small borough in Rapla Parish, Rapla County, Estonia.

Between 1993 and 2017 (until the administrative reform of Estonian local governments ), the town was the administrative center of Kaiu Parish.

References

External links
Kaiu Parish 

Boroughs and small boroughs in Estonia
Kreis Harrien